The House of Commons is the name of several legislatures, most often the lower house in a bicameral system:

Current
 House of Commons of the United Kingdom (since 1801)
 House of Commons of Canada (since 1867)

Historical
 House of Commons of England (1295-1706)
 House of Commons of Great Britain (1707-1800)
 Irish House of Commons (1297-1800)
 House of Commons of Southern Ireland (1921–1922)
 House of Commons of Northern Ireland (1921–1972)
 House of Commons, name of the North Carolina House of Representatives from 1760 to 1868